Beef cattle are cattle raised for meat production (as distinguished from dairy cattle, used for milk production). The meat of mature or almost mature cattle is mostly known as beef.
In beef production there are three main stages: cow-calf operations, backgrounding, and feedlot operations.  The production cycle of the animals starts at cow-calf operations; this operation is designed specifically to breed cows for their offspring. From here the calves are backgrounded for a feedlot. Animals grown specifically for the feedlot are known as feeder cattle, the goal of these animals is fattening. Animals not grown for a feedlot are typically female and are commonly known as replacement heifers.
While the principal use of beef cattle is meat production, other uses include leather, and beef by-products used in candy, shampoo, cosmetics, and insulin.

Calving and breeding
Besides breeding to meet the demand for beef production, owners also use selective breeding to attain specific traits in their beef cattle. An example of a desired trait could be leaner meat or resistance to illness. Breeds known as dual-purpose are also used for beef production. These breeds have been selected for two purposes at once, such as both beef and dairy production, or both beef and draught. Dual-purpose breeds include many of the Zebu breeds of India such as Tharparkar and Ongole Cattle. There are multiple continental breeds that were bred for this purpose as well. The original Simmental/Fleckvieh from Switzerland is a prime example. Not only are they a dual-purpose breed for beef and dairy, but in the past they were also used for draught. However, throughout the generations, the breed has diverged into two groups through selective breeding.

Most beef cattle are mated naturally, whereby a bull is released into a cowherd approximately 55 days after the calving period, depending on the cows' body condition score (BCS). If it was a cow's first time calving, she will take longer to re-breed by at least 10 days. However, beef cattle can also be bred through artificial insemination, depending on the cow and the size of the herd. Cattle are normally bred during the summer so that calving may occur the following spring. However, cattle breeding can occur at other times of year. Depending on the operation, calving may occur all year round. Owners can select the breeding time based on a number of factors, including reproductive performance, seasonal cattle pricing and handling facilities.

There are many factors that come into play when selecting for a bull. Some of the most important factors are disease prevention/spread. Buying a bull who hasn't been tested for common diseases is a risk, it would more than likely transmit to a whole herd. Purchasing genetics that will improve the original herd rather than remaining the same or decreasing. Some breed for mothering abilities, some for size, some for meat properties, etc. Breeding Soundness Examination or BSE are essential to the quality of any bull, a general physical exam and inspection of both the genital organs and their productivity. Knowing more information about the animal will help make an educated decision.

Cattle maintenance
Cattle handlers are expected to maintain a low stress environment for their herds, involving constant safety, health, comfort, nourishment and humane handling. According to the Canadian National Farm Animal Care Council, beef cattle must have access to shelter from extreme weather, safe handling and equipment, veterinary care and humane slaughter.
If an animal is infected or suspected to have an illness, it is the responsibility of the owners to report it immediately to a practicing veterinarian for either treatment or euthanasia. Depending on a multitude of factors (season, type of production system, stocking density, etc.), illness and disease can spread quickly through the herd from animal to animal. Owners are expected to monitor their cattle's condition regularly for early detection and treatment, as some cattle illnesses can threaten both cattle and human health (known as zoonotic) as witnessed with Mad cow disease and Tuberculosis.

On average, cattle will consume 1.4 to 4% of their body weight daily. There are a range of types of feed available for these animals. The standard text in the United States, Nutrient Requirements of Beef Cattle, has been through eight editions over at least seventy years. The 1996 seventh edition substituted the concept of metabolizeable protein for the sixth edition's crude protein. In the 20th century, Canadian practice followed the American guidance. Already in 1970, the Food and Drug Administration was regulating pharmaceutical supplements in beef cattle feed such as hormones and prophylactic antibiotics.

Some animals live on pasture their entire lives and therefore only experience fresh grass, these are typically cow-calf operations in more tropical climates. Backgrounded calves and feedlot animals tend to have different diets that contain more grain than the pasture type. Grain is more expensive than pasture but the animals grow faster with the higher protein levels. Since cattle are herbivores and need roughage in their diet, silage, hay and/or haylage are all viable feed options.
Despite this 3/4th of the 32 pounds (14.52 kg) of feed cattle consume each day will be corn. Cattle weighing 1000 lbs. will drink an average of 41 L a day, and approximately 82 L in hot weather. They need a constant supply of good quality feed and potable water according to the 5 Freedoms of Animal Welfare.

Most Beef cattle are finished in feedlots. The first feedlots were constructed in the early 1950s. Some of these feedlots grew so large they warranted a new designation, "Concentrated Animal Feeding Operation" (CAFO). Most American beef cattle spend the last half of their lives in a CAFO.

Cattle processing
The carcass is then hung in a cold room for between one and four weeks, during which time it loses some weight as water dries from the meat. Depending on what cuts of meat are desired, there is a scale of marbled meat used to determine the quality. Marbling is the fat that is within the muscle, not around it. The more marbled a cut is, the higher it will grade and be worth more.

Slaughtering of livestock has three distinct stages: preslaughter handling, stunning and slaughtering. The biggest concern is preslaughter handling, how the animal is treated before it is stunned and slaughtered. Stress at this time can cause adverse effects on the meat, water access and lower stocking densities have been allowed to minimize this. However, access to feed is restricted for 12–24 hours prior to slaughtering for ease of evisceration. Stunning is done when the animal is restrained in a chute so movement is limited. Once restrained the animal can be stunned in one of three methods: penetrating captive bolt, non-penetrating captive bolt and gunshot. Most abattoirs use captive bolts over guns. Stunning ensures the animal feels no pain during slaughtering and reduces the animals stress, therefore increasing the quality of meat. The final step is slaughtering, typically the animal will be hung by its back leg and its throat will be slit to allow exsanguination. The hide will be removed for further processing at this point and the animal will be broken down with evisceration and decapitation. The carcass will be placed in a cooler for 24–48 hours prior to meat cutting.

Breeds

See also

 Conjugated linoleic acid
 List of cattle breeds

References

External links
 Oklahoma State University pages about cattle breeds.

Cattle breeds